Thng Tekchiong (POJ: Thng Tek-chiong, 6 January 1907 – 13 March 1947), also known as , was a Taiwanese lawyer of Japanese descent, born in Tainan during Japanese rule. He was killed in the February 28 Incident.

Life
Tekchiong's parents Tokuzo Sakai and Thng Gio̍k married in 1902. At the time, marriages between Japanese and Taiwanese were illegal, and Tekchiong took his maternal surname. Tekchiong's father was a police officer. The family was not compensated, and Tekchiong grew up poor. He received some financial help from a traditional Han physician named Iûⁿ Choân. He graduated from Tapani Elementary School, but dropped out of Tainan Normal School (now the National University of Tainan), and worked on his family's farm, and then later at a sugar refinery. At that time, he enhanced his knowledge and fighting skills by learning Classic Sinitic language, Four Books and Five Classics, martial arts and Japanese martial arts. He married a year later. Tekchiong left law enforcement to pursue legal studies in Japan at the age of 32. He returned to Taiwan in 1943.

February 28 Incident
Thng Tekchiong was elected mayoral candidate by all Tainan senators, leaders of villages citizen organizations, and student representatives in 1947, when the February 28 Incident occurred.

After the 21st Division of National Revolutionary Army (NRA) descended on Tainan, about twenty gendarmes broke into Tekchiong's house on 11 March 1947, to arrest him for the crime of rebellion. During his arrest, Tekchiong burned a list containing the names of people on the Settlement Committee, an action regarded to have saved their lives. Tekchiong was interrogated by NRA soldiers regarding his ancestry, to which Tang reportedly replied, "I was born in Taiwan, I was raised in Taiwan. Am I not Taiwanese?" They insisted he was Japanese and Tekchiong challenged them to question him in the Japanese language. The next day, Tekchiong was hung upside down, tortured and paraded. On 13 March, Tekchiong was shot at Taishō Park (大正公園).

References

February 28 incident
Executed Taiwanese people
Taiwanese people of Japanese descent
20th-century Taiwanese lawyers
Tsou people
1907 births
1947 deaths
People from Tainan
Taiwanese police officers
People executed by the Republic of China by firearm